No. 460 Squadron is a Royal Australian Air Force intelligence unit active within the Defence Imagery and Geospatial Organisation (DIGO). It was first formed as a heavy bomber squadron during World War II on 15 November 1941 and disbanded on 10 October 1945 after seeing extensive combat over Europe. The squadron was a multinational unit, but most personnel were Australian. No. 460 Squadron was reformed on 2 July 2010 and is currently located in Canberra.

History

World War II

No. 460 Squadron RAAF was formed from 'C' Flight of No. 458 Squadron RAAF at RAF Molesworth, Huntingdonshire on 15 November 1941, as a bomber squadron equipped with Wellington Mk.IV aircraft. Originally part of No. 8 Group RAF, Bomber Command, the squadron moved to RAF Breighton, Yorkshire and joined No. 1 Group RAF. The squadron made its first raid, against the German city of Emden, on 12 March 1942. The following night, five crews from the squadron participated in a raid on harbour facilities around Dunkirk, during which the squadron suffered its first losses of the war when one Wellington was shot down. A six-week "apprenticeship" period followed until the end of April 1942, during which the squadron was assigned mainly to attack less heavily defended targets on the French Channel coast; nevertheless, the squadron also undertook several attacks against targets in Germany during this time also. The squadron's first three months of operations saw it carry out 34 raids. For each raid, at least two aircraft were contributed, with some raids seeing as many as 10 aircraft taking part; a 30 May 1942 raid on Cologne saw 18 aircraft from No. 460 Squadron assigned. A total of six crews were lost during these raids.

Losses between June and August amounted to 20 aircraft, and at the end of the period the squadron began to convert to Halifax Mk.IIs, but in October the squadron was re-equipped with Lancaster Mks. I and III. The following May, No. 460 Squadron relocated to RAF Binbrook, Lincolnshire, from where it participated in the strategic bombing of Germany.

In late 1943 and early 1944, the squadron flew sorties in the Battle of Berlin. During the spring and summer of 1944, the squadron flew many missions in support of the D-Day landings. Its final raid was an attack on Adolf Hitler's mountain retreat of Berchtesgaden on Anzac Day, 1945. In May, No. 460 Squadron joined Operation Manna, the transportation of relief supplies to starving Dutch civilians. The squadron moved to RAF East Kirkby, Lincolnshire, in preparation for re-location to the Pacific theatre, as part of a proposed Commonwealth strategic air force known as Tiger Force, for the invasion of Japan. The move became unnecessary following the atomic bombings of Hiroshima and Nagasaki and No. 460 Squadron disbanded on 10 October 1945.

The squadron flew the most sorties of any Australian bomber squadron and dropped more bomb tonnage than any squadron in the whole of Bomber Command—24,856 tons, which it dropped over 6,262 sorties. In doing that it lost 188 aircraft and suffered 1,018 combat deaths (589 of whom were Australian). This was the most of any Australian squadron during the war, with No. 460 Squadron effectively wiped out five times over its existence. RAF Bomber Command represented only two percent of total Australian enlistments during World War II, but accounted for almost 20 percent of personnel killed in action. Total Bomber Command losses were 55,573 for all nationalities.

No. 460 Squadron is commemorated at the Australian War Memorial by a display featuring its only surviving aircraft, G for George. This aircraft made 90 operational sorties between late 1942 and mid-1944. There is a memorial to the squadron on the site of the former RAF Binbrook, in Lincolnshire, UK, consisting of a plaque, trees and various memorial benches. There are also memorials in a number of other countries including Denmark, France, the Netherlands (Grafhorst) and Germany, marking the sites of where squadron aircraft crashed or individual crew members were killed.

Current role

On 1 April 2010, then Chief of Air Force Air Marshal Mark Binskin announced that No. 460 Squadron was to be reformed as a non-flying squadron within the Defence Imagery and Geospatial Organisation (DIGO). The squadron was subsequently re-established on 2 July at a ceremony held in front of G for George at the Australian War Memorial.

No. 460 Squadron is currently located in Canberra. Its roles include analysing photos and other imagery to help plan strike missions.

Aircraft operated

Squadron bases

Commanding officers

See also
 Article XV squadrons
 Roberts Dunstan

References

Bibliography

External links

 Official RAAF webpage for 460 Squadron
 Official RAF webpage for 460 Squadron 
 A 460 Squadron tribute site
 Wartime Memories Project – No.460 Squadron RAAF
 Peter Dunn's 460 Squadron tribute site
 Eyewitness accounts from 460 Squadron by F/O Henry Baskerville
 ADF-Serials Vickers Wellington in RAAF Service
 ADF-Serials Handley Page Halifax in RAAF Service 
 ADF-Serials Avro Lancasters in RAAF Service
 ADF-Serials 460 Squadron RAAF Photo Album

460 Squadron
Military units and formations established in 1941
Australian Article XV squadrons of World War II